The women's triple jump event at the 2010 Asian Games was held at the Aoti Main Stadium, Guangzhou, China on 25 November, during the 2010 Asian Games.

Schedule
All times are China Standard Time (UTC+08:00)

Records

Results 
Legend
DNS — Did not stat
NM — No mark

References

Results

Athletics at the 2010 Asian Games
2010